Ludwig Ernstsson (born 29 April 1972) is a retired Swedish football striker.

He grew up in both Räppe and Ör, since his parents were separated. He joined Östers IF, made his senior debut in 1992 and joined Kongsvinger IL in 1997. Here he scored ten Norwegian Premier League goals in 1997 and 1998. In the middle of the season he left Kongsvinger for Austria Wien. He stayed here until 2000, when he returned to Öster.

After retiring he became a youth coach. In 2009, he was promoted to assistant coach for the senior team. In July 2010 he was promoted to head coach, only to be replaced two months later - following a six-game losing streak - by Hans Gren.
Another two months later, on November 10, it was announced that Ernstsson and Öster parted ways for the time being.

References

1972 births
Living people
Swedish footballers
Östers IF players
Kongsvinger IL Toppfotball players
FK Austria Wien players
People from Växjö
Swedish expatriate footballers
Expatriate footballers in Norway
Swedish expatriate sportspeople in Norway
Expatriate footballers in Austria
Swedish expatriate sportspeople in Austria
Swedish football managers
Superettan players
Austrian Football Bundesliga players
Eliteserien players
Association football forwards
Sportspeople from Kronoberg County